is a Japanese voice actor and narrator who is affiliated with Arts Vision. He is most well known for his role as Kazuma Sato in the anime/light novel series Konosuba. He has been acting since the 1990s.

Personal life
He is the eldest of three brothers.

He also works as a lecturer at Nihon Narēshon Engi Kenkyūjo.

His first appearance in Niconico live broadcast (for Kotoura-san ) have created a huge impact on the Japanese audience, due to the way he acted freely (he was often compared to a comedian by the Japanese audience.) during the broadcast, which was completely opposite to the image of the character he voiced previously – Jin Muso from Aquarion Evol. But according to other voice actors (such as Kana Hanazawa and Hiroki Yasumoto), Fukushima is actually a very serious person at the recording studio that barely speaks. His style during live broadcast and radio is likely to be affected by the personality of the characters he voiced.

Filmography

Anime

Animated films

Original video animation (OVA)

Original net animation (ONA)

Games

Live-Action

Dubbing

Live-action

Animation

References

External links
 Jun Fukushima at Arts Vision
 Jun Fukushima at Ameblo
 

1976 births
Male voice actors from Ehime Prefecture
Japanese male video game actors
Japanese male voice actors
Living people
20th-century Japanese male actors
21st-century Japanese male actors
Arts Vision voice actors